The 2012–13 Troy Trojans men's basketball team represented Troy University during the 2012–13 NCAA Division I men's basketball season. The Trojans, led by 31st year head coach Don Maestri, played their home games at Trojan Arena and were members of the East Division of the Sun Belt Conference. They finished the season 12–21, 6–14 in Sun Belt play to finish in last place in the East Division. They lost in the quarterfinals of the Sun Belt tournament to Arkansas State.

Roster

Schedule

|-
!colspan=9| Exhibition

|-
!colspan=9| Regular season

|-
!colspan=9|
2013 Sun Belt tournament

References

Troy Trojans men's basketball seasons
Troy
2012 in sports in Alabama
2013 in sports in Alabama